Snapped: She Made Me Do It is an American true crime television series that aired on the Oxygen Network from September 9, 2015 to June 25, 2016. The program focuses on women who are accused of masterminding heinous crimes. The series is produced by Joke Productions, a Los Angeles, California-based company operated by Joke Fincioen and her husband Biagio Messina. Fincioen and Messina also serve as the show's executive producers. Snapped: She Made Me Do It is one of two spin-off series of the Oxygen Network original series Snapped.

Episodes

Season 1 (2015)

Season 2 (2016)

References

Oxygen (TV channel) original programming